A great number of movies have been made about race relations, or with a strong racial theme over the last century, from D. W. Griffith's The Birth of a Nation (1915) to Marvel Studios' Black Panther (2018).

Early years (1915-1960)
D. W. Griffith's 1915 film The Birth of a Nation set the precedent of heavily racialized stereotypes of African Americans (many played by white actors in blackface) as clowns or predators, and cast the Ku Klux Klan as the saviours of white America. Later films like Dark Command (1940), Song of the South and Gone With the Wind (1939) repeated some of those stereotypes.

Other films, like the Marx Brothers' A Day at the Races and Hellzapoppin' showcased early black performers like Whitey's Lindy Hoppers and Slim and Slam. With Carmen Jones (1954) and Porgy and Bess (1959) Hollywood put George Gershwin's and Oscar Hammerstein II's Broadway shows - that reworked Jazz performances for white audiences - on screen with stars Harry Belafonte and Dorothy Dandridge.

Race films were marketed to black audiences, like Hi-De-Ho featuring Jazz performer Cab Calloway.

The quintessential American film, the western was often about implicitly about race, since it described the westward journey of colonists into the lands of Native Americans.

Civil Rights Era
With the growth of the Civil Rights Movement Hollywood was on the whole on the liberal side, with films like To Kill a Mockingbird, West Side Story, Guess Who's Coming to Dinner and In the Heat of the Night looking at race prejudice critically.

Blaxploitation and Gangsta films
With the rise of the Black Panther Party Hollywood tried to stay relevant with Black Power-themed films like Shaft, Superfly and Foxy Brown, which became known as Blaxploitation films. Still, the new genre was an opportunity for director Melvin van Peebles and actors including Richard Rountree, Pam Grier and also for musician Curtis Mayfield whose sound track accompanied the hit Superfly.

Though Blaxploitation genre is in the past, filmmakers have excited black and white audiences with stories of gangs and crime that tread a fine line between glorifying and vilifying gangsters, such as New Jack City, South Central and Juice. Rap music, too, has given a new dimension to black gang films, with All Eyez on Me about the life and death of Tupac Shakur and Notorious about the killing of Notorious B.I.G.

Race revenge fantasies
In the 1970s and 1980s a backlash against Civil Rights was met by more films about black criminality threatening white communities. In Sudden Impact Clint Eastwood's character Harry Callahan goads a black rapist holding a woman hostage, 'go ahead, make my day' - meaning, 'shoot her, so I can shoot you.' The Dirty Harry series of films, like the Death Wish one appealed to a reaction against Civil Rights with fantasy violence against black and other criminals.

Another way that films titillated white audiences was with fantasies of black people rising up against white society.  The British film Zulu showed a small platoon of Redcoats fighting against thousands of Zulu warriors at Rorke's Drift at the end of the nineteenth century. Later John Carpenter achieved a similar effect surrounding a police station with a coalescence of Puerto Rican gangs in Assault on Precinct 13.

Historical Civil Rights, Jim Crow era, Civil War and Slavery films
By the 1990s American attitudes on race were becoming more liberal and a new wave of films looked back at the Civil Rights Movement as history, beginning with Alan Parker's Mississippi Burning of 1989 right through to Ghosts of Mississippi in 1996 More recently Ava DuVernay's film Selma has shown there is much more in the civil rights era.
The Civil War also got a different historical treatment in the film Glory about black Union troops. Civil War dramas like Lincoln (2012) and Free State of Jones.
Historical dramas proved a rich seam for Hollywood which went on to deal with slavery in Steven Spielberg's Amistad and Steven McQueen's 12 Years a Slave.
More radical black leaders, like Malcolm X and the Black Panthers had their story told in films by Spike Lee and Mario Van Peebles in 1992 and 1995.

Social comment films since 1990
As well as a great rise in the number of historical dramas around slavery, civil rights and historical racism, more social comment films about race relations have been made since the 1990s. Spike Lee's breakout movie Do the Right Thing (1989) opened up the field for a lot more searching examination of race in present day. Films like such as Justin Simien's 2014 comedy Dear White People, the academy award-winning Moonlight and Jordan Peele's 2017 horror film Get Out show that film audiences continue to be gripped by racial conflict.

Notable films with a race theme, by year

See also 
 List of racism-related films
 Race in horror films

References

Films about racism
Lists of films by topic